Thomas Erdelyi (born Tamás Erdélyi, ; January 29, 1949 – July 11, 2014), known professionally as Tommy Ramone, was a Hungarian American record producer and musician. He was the drummer for the influential punk rock band the Ramones from its debut in 1974 to 1978, later serving as its producer, and was the longest-surviving original member of the Ramones.

Background 
Tamás Erdélyi was born on January 29, 1949, in Budapest. His Jewish parents were professional photographers, who survived the Holocaust by being hidden by neighbors. Many of his relatives were killed by the Nazis.

The family left Hungary during the Hungarian Revolution of 1956. In 1957 he emigrated with his family to the United States. Initially settling in the South Bronx, the family moved up to the middle-class neighborhood of Forest Hills in Queens, New York. Verona Estates in Forest Hills was the place where Tamás grew up and later described as "home sweet home". He changed his name to Thomas Erdelyi.

In high school, Tommy played guitar in a mid-1960s, four-piece garage band, the Tangerine Puppets, with a schoolmate and guitarist, John Cummings, the future Johnny Ramone. After leaving school at 18, he started working as an assistant engineer at the Record Plant studio, where he worked on the production of the 1970 Jimi Hendrix album Band of Gypsys.

Producer and drummer for the Ramones 
When the Ramones first came together, with Johnny Ramone on guitar, Dee Dee Ramone on bass and Joey Ramone on drums, Erdelyi was supposed to be the manager, but, even though he never played drums before, was drafted as the band's drummer when Joey became the lead singer, after realizing that he couldn't keep up with the Ramones' increasingly fast tempos. "Tommy Ramone, who was managing us, finally had to sit down behind the drums, because nobody else wanted to," Dee Dee later recalled.

He remained as drummer from 1974 to 1978, playing on and co-producing their first three albums, Ramones, Leave Home, and Rocket to Russia, as well as the live album It's Alive. His final show as a Ramones drummer was at Johnny Blitz benefit event at CBGB's in New York, USA on May 4, 1978.

In a 2007, interview with the BBC, Tommy Ramone said the band had been heavily influenced by 1970s, glam-rock band the New York Dolls, by singer-songwriter Lou Reed and by pop-art figure Andy Warhol. He said, "The scene that developed at CBGB wasn't [for] a teenage or garage band; there was an intellectual element and that's the way it was for The Ramones."

Behind the scenes with the Ramones 
Tommy Ramone was replaced on drums in 1978 by Marky Ramone, but handled band management and co-production for their fourth album, Road to Ruin; he later returned as producer for their eighth album, 1984's Too Tough to Die.

Tommy Ramone wrote "I Wanna Be Your Boyfriend" and the majority of "Blitzkrieg Bop" while bassist Dee Dee suggested the title. He and Ed Stasium played all the guitar solos on the albums he produced, as Johnny Ramone largely preferred playing rhythm guitar. In the 1980s he produced the Replacements album Tim, as well as Redd Kross's Neurotica. He returned to the producer's chair in 2002, overseeing the reunion of former Ramones C.J. and Marky for their recording of Jed Davis' Joey Ramone tribute "The Bowery Electric".

On October 8, 2004, on what would have been Johnny Ramone's 56th birthday, he played as a Ramone once again, when he joined C.J. Ramone, Daniel Rey, and Clem Burke (also known as Elvis Ramone) in the "Ramones Beat Down on Cancer" concert. In October 2007 in an interview to promote It's Alive 1974–1996 a two-DVD set of the band's best televised live performances he paid tribute to his deceased bandmates:

Ramone and Claudia Tienan (formerly of underground band the Simplistics) performed as a bluegrass-based folk duo called Uncle Monk. Ramone stated: "There are a lot of similarities between punk and old-time music. Both are home-brewed music as opposed to schooled, and both have an earthy energy. And anybody can pick up an instrument and start playing." He joined songwriter Chris Castle, Garth Hudson, Larry Campbell and the Womack Family Band in July 2011 at Levon Helm Studios for Castle's album Last Bird Home.

Illness and death 
Tommy Ramone died at his home in Ridgewood, Queens, New York, on July 11, 2014, aged 65. He had received hospice care following unsuccessful treatment for bile duct cancer.

In The Independent, Loulla-Mae Eleftheriou-Smith wrote that "before Tommy left the line-up, the Ramones had already become one of the most influential punk bands of the day, playing at the infamous CBGB's in the Bowery area of New York and touring for each album incessantly." In response to the Ramone's death, the band's official Twitter account had been tweeting previous quotes from band members, including his own 1976 comment that New York was the "perfect place to grow up neurotic". He added: "One of the reasons that the Ramones were so unique and original was that they were four original, unique people."

Writing in Variety, Cristopher Morris said: "Tommy's driving, high-energy drum work was the turbine that powered the leather-clad foursome's loud, antic sound."

Discography

Discography with the Ramones 
 Ramones (1976)
 Leave Home (1977)
 Rocket to Russia (1977)
 Road to Ruin (1978, producer only)
 It's Alive (Recorded in Rainbow Theatre, on 31st December 1977, released in 1979)
 Too Tough to Die (1984, producer only)
 NYC 1978 (2003)

Discography with Uncle Monk 
 Uncle Monk (2006)

References

Bibliography

External links 
 
 
 Uncle Monk website
 Uncle Monk on Myspace

American people of Hungarian-Jewish descent
American punk rock drummers
American male drummers
Record producers from New York (state)
Deaths from cancer in New York (state)
Deaths from cholangiocarcinoma
Hungarian emigrants to the United States
Hungarian rock musicians
Hungarian record producers
Hungarian Jews
Jewish American musicians
Jewish punk rock musicians
Musicians from Budapest
Musicians from Queens, New York
People from Forest Hills, Queens
Tommy
20th-century American drummers
21st-century American drummers
Burials at New Montefiore Cemetery
People from Ridgewood, Queens
1949 births
2014 deaths